The 1st constituency of Vendée (French: Première circonscription de la Vendée) is a French legislative constituency in the Vendéedépartement. Like the other 576 French constituencies, it elects one MP using the two-round system, with a run-off if no candidate receives over 50% of the vote in the first round.

Description

The 1st Constituency of Vendée is situated in the north of the department including the northern section of La Roche-sur-Yon.

Between this seats establishment on its current boundaries in 1988 and the 2017 this seat consistently centre-right candidates. For twenty four years the seat was held by Jean-Luc Préel.

Deputies

Election results

2022

 
 
 
 
 
 
 
|-
| colspan="8" bgcolor="#E9E9E9"|
|-

2017

 
 
 
 
 
 
|-
| colspan="8" bgcolor="#E9E9E9"|
|-

2012

 
 
 
 
 
 
|-
| colspan="8" bgcolor="#E9E9E9"|
|-

2007

 
 
 
 
 
 
 
|-
| colspan="8" bgcolor="#E9E9E9"|
|-
 
 

 
 
 
 
 

* Withdrew before the 2nd round

2002

 
 
 
 
 
 
|-
| colspan="8" bgcolor="#E9E9E9"|
|-

1997

References

1